Carex malaccensis is a tussock-forming species of perennial sedge in the family Cyperaceae. It is native to parts of Malaysia.

See also
List of Carex species

References

malaccensis
Flora of Peninsular Malaysia
Plants described in 1894
Taxa named by Charles Baron Clarke